Til Death is a full-length studio album by American punk band the Undead, and the band's first release since their eponymous 1995 three-song cassette. Til Death was recorded in 1997, in Bobby Steele's bedroom in New York. It was released on June 25, 1998 on Underworld Records/Post Mortem Records. A promo version was issued in April 1998. The second and subsequent pressings feature different artwork than the original pressing due to the vast amount of bootlegs that arose around the time of the album's initial release.

Track listing
"The Future Kid" (Bobby Steele/Dave Street)
"There's a Riot in Tompkin's Square" (Steele)
"Shadows" (Steele)
"Til Death" (Steele)
"All You Need Is Love" (Lennon–McCartney)
"I Don't Wanna Feel the Pain Anymore" (Steele/Street)
"Strange Creatures" (Steele)
"Slave to Fashion" (Steele)
"I'm So Happy" (Steele)
"The Invisible Man" (Steele)
"I'd Rather Do My Drinking Alone" (Steele/Street)
"They Lied" (Sam Herman/Steele)
"The Thorn in Your Side" (Steele)

Credits
 Bobby Steele - vocals, guitar, bass, drum machine 
 

The Undead albums
1998 albums